S79 may refer to:
 County Route S79 (Bergen County, New Jersey)
 Expressway S79 (Poland)
 Green Sea Airport in Horry County, South Carolina, United States
 , a submarine of the Israeli Navy
 S79 Select Bus Service (New York City bus) serving Staten Island
 Savoia-Marchetti S.79, an Italian bomber